Enrico Kölling (born 27 February 1990), occasionally spelled Koelling or Kolling, is a German professional boxer who challenged for the IBF light-heavyweight title in 2017.

Amateur career

Youth
Enrico Kölling started boxing at the age of 8. An early step in his career was winning the gold medal at the German Junior National Championships at the age of 17, in Altentreptow in 2007, as he defeated Alexander Onozke and Dominik Bösel in the middle weight division.

Kölling first achieved success at international level in July 2007, when he grasped the bronze medal following his defeat in the middle weight (75 kg) semi final at the 2007 European Amateur Boxing Championships in Sambor, Serbia; he lost his semifinal to Nikola Jovanovic, the only boxer from the host nation to win a title at the event. In the following year, 2008, Kölling competed at the Youth World Amateur Boxing Championships, in which a total of 359 fighters from 68 different countries competed in Guadalajara, Mexico. After beating four of his opponents, Kölling failed to get the gold medal in the middle weight final, which was scored 4:2 in favour of Rey Eduardo Recio from Cuba.

Senior
After he moved up a weight division, at the age of 19, Kölling became the German National champion at light heavyweight (81 kg), beating Eugen Schellenberg, Dennis Gördel and Benjamin Schmidt.

In May 2011, Kölling secured his spot in the German National team to take part at the 2011 World Amateur Boxing Championships to be held in Baku, Azerbaijan between 16 September 2011 to 1 October, following his victory against his compatriot Tyron Zeuge in the Round Robin Team Tournament in Germany. Kölling entered into the World Championship as the No.4 seeded athlete in the 81 kg. division, gaining a bye in first round. He beat Erdenebayar Sandagsuren of Mongolia in the second round on points, before he was defeated by the eventual winner Julio César la Cruz after 3 rounds, 8–6 on points.  Through his performance at this competition he qualified for the 2012 Summer Olympics.

At the 2012 Olympics (results) he beat Christian Donfack Adjoufack from Cameroon then lost to Algerian Abdelhafid Benchabla 9-12.

World Series of Boxing 
From 2010 onwards Kölling participated in the AIBA organised "World Series of Boxing".  In the 2010 series, he was part of the "Istanbulls" team.  In this competition, he competed in the 85 kg weight division (a weight division created for the World Series of Boxing), winning 4 fights out of 5.

In 2011, he switched teams to compete for the "Leipzig Leopards".  In the second season, he won 3 fights.

Professional career
After the 2012 Summer Olympics, Kölling switched to the professional ranks. In the same year, he made his professional debut.

In 2013, he won all 8 of his professional fights, including his first professional fight outside Germany, in London at the O2 Arena.

Koelling vs. Aduashvili 
He won his first professional title in 2014, beating Paata Aduashvili to win the vacant WBO Youth Light Heavyweight Title.

In the same year, he fought in 7 more fights, winning all of them. One of these fights lead to Kölling winning his first senior professional title, when he beat French boxer Patrick Bois to win the WBA intercontinental title in June 2014.  He defended his title against Giuseppe Brischetto in August 2014, before losing it to Mirco Ricci in February 2015.  The loss to Ricci was his first defeat in 16 professional fights. In 2014 he competed in another 4 fights, winning all of them.

In April 2016, he won the vacant WBA intercontinental title by defeating the Ukrainian boxer Oleksandr Cherviak. He defended his title in October 2016 against South African Ryno Liebenberg. The return fight against Liebenberg in February 2017, held at Emperors Palace in Kempton Park, was Kölling's first match outside of Germany since 2013.  The second victory over Liebenberg meant that Kölling had won 23 professional fights out of 24.

Koelling vs. Beterbiev 
Following on from this, he fought Artur Beterbiev at the Save Mart Arena in Fresno, California for the vacant IBF World Light-Heavyweight title. Beterbiev was ranked #2 by the IBF at the time, while Koelling was ranked at #3. Beterbiev won the fight in the 12th round by knock out.

2018 began with a win for Kölling, beating fellow German Robert Müller with a TKO in January.  He then beat Giorgi Beroshvili by knock out in March 2018. In June 2018, he beat the Latvian Andrejs Pokumeiko.

Koelling vs. Boesel 
In recognition of his performances, he fought Dominic Bösel for the EBU European Light Heavyweight title. Kölling lost to Bösel in a points decision, 111-118, 113-116 and 113-115 on the scorecards.

Professional boxing record

Personal life
Kölling is interested in football and supports Hertha Berlin.

See also
 2008 Youth World Amateur Boxing Championships
 2011 World Amateur Boxing Championships

References

External links
  
 
 
 
 
 
Enrico Koelling - Profile, News Archive & Current Rankings at Box.Live

1990 births
Light-heavyweight boxers
Boxers from Berlin
Living people
Boxers at the 2012 Summer Olympics
Olympic boxers of Germany
German male boxers